Calum Campbell (born 7 November 1965) was a Scottish footballer who played for Airdrie, Partick Thistle, Kilmarnock and Dumbarton.

References

1965 births
Scottish footballers
Dumbarton F.C. players
Airdrieonians F.C. (1878) players
Kilmarnock F.C. players
Partick Thistle F.C. players
Scottish Football League players
Living people
Association football forwards
Ardrossan Winton Rovers F.C. players